Steffen Bogs (born 8 October 1965 in Rostock) is a German rower.

References 
 
 

1965 births
Living people
Rowers from Rostock
People from Bezirk Rostock
East German male rowers
Olympic rowers of East Germany
Rowers at the 1988 Summer Olympics
Olympic medalists in rowing
Olympic bronze medalists for East Germany
Medalists at the 1988 Summer Olympics
Recipients of the Patriotic Order of Merit in bronze